Diaethria nystographa is a species of butterfly of the genus Diaethria. It was described by Achille Guenée in 1872. It is found in Peru, Ecuador, Colombia and Venezuela.

Subspecies
D. n. nystographa (Ecuador)
D. n. aliciae Neild, 1996 (Venezuela)
D. n. charis (Oberthür, 1916) (Colombia)
D. n. panthalis (Honrath, 1884) (Venezuela)
D. n. perezi Lamas, 1995 (Peru, south-western Ecuador)

References

Biblidinae
Butterflies described in 1872
Nymphalidae of South America
Taxa named by Achille Guenée